The FG-36 (AKA Fengyun 2 AKM) was a Chinese spin stabilized apogee kick motor burning HTPB. It was developed by China Hexi Chemical and Machinery Corporation (also known as the 6th Academy of CASIC) for use in the Fengyun 2 satellite bus for insertion into GSO orbit.

While it was designed as an apogee kick motor and as such it flew in spin stabilized mode, it was also adapted to the Long March 1D third stage. It was paired with a RCS in a similar solution to the CTS.

See also
 Fengyun 2
 Long March 1D
 CTS

References

Rocket engines of China
Solid-fuel rockets